Alas Dose is a 2001 Philippine action film directed by Augusto Salvador. The film stars Cesar Montano, who wrote the story, and Christopher de Leon.

The film is streaming online on YouTube.

Cast
 Cesar Montano as Titus Varona
 Christopher de Leon as Remo Doce
 Sunshine Cruz as May Vergara
 Behn Cervantes as Carlos Alejo
 Patricia Javier as PO2 Katrina Aguilar
 Bon Vibar as Gen. Rodrigo Banares
 Dick Israel as PO4 Magno
 Rommel Montano as Zaballero
 Rico J. Puno as Congressman
 Minco Fabregas as Tanchanco
 Alvin Bernales as Magno
 Jerry Mongcal as Sanchez
 Rico Miguel as Gamboa
 Jun Collao as Bomb Squad Member
 Jerry Lopez as Bomb Squad Member
 Issah Alcadra as Bryan
 Jackie Castillejos as Reporter
 Mel Kimura as Teacher
 Leychard Sicangco as Orosa
 Ace Espinosa as C-4 Dealer

Production
Production of the film took over a year with Erik Matti initially at the helm. Halfway though the film, Matti dropped out to focus on another film and the project was postponed for the wedding and honeymoon of Cesar and Sunshine. When production resumed, Augusto Salvador took over the directorial duties.

Awards

References

External links

Full Movie on Viva Films

2001 films
Filipino-language films
Philippine action films
Viva Films films
Films directed by Augusto Salvador